Sharon is a town in Weakley County, Tennessee, United States. The population was 988 at the 2000 census and 944 at the 2010 census.

Geography
Sharon is located at  (36.233268, -88.825000).

This does not include the Elementary/Middle School that is located near the center of the town.

Demographics

As of the census of 2000, there were 988 people, 446 households, and 300 families residing in the town. The population density was 857.3 people per square mile (331.7/km2). There were 490 housing units at an average density of 425.2 per square mile (164.5/km2). The racial makeup of the town was 89.17% White, 10.22% African American, 0.10% Pacific Islander, 0.40% from other races, and 0.10% from two or more races. Hispanic or Latino of any race were 0.40% of the population.

There were 446 households, out of which 23.3% had children under the age of 18 living with them, 55.6% were married couples living together, 9.2% had a female householder with no husband present, and 32.7% were non-families. 29.6% of all households were made up of individuals, and 19.1% had someone living alone who was 65 years of age or older. The average household size was 2.22 and the average family size was 2.73.

In the town, the population was spread out, with 19.4% under the age of 18, 6.4% from 18 to 24, 24.9% from 25 to 44, 26.8% from 45 to 64, and 22.5% who were 65 years of age or older. The median age was 44 years. For every 100 females, there were 93.7 males. For every 100 females age 18 and over, there were 87.7 males.

The median income for a household in the town was $27,639, and the median income for a family was $39,643. Males had a median income of $29,018 versus $17,708 for females. The per capita income for the town was $15,746. About 11.3% of families and 12.7% of the population were below the poverty line, including 15.3% of those under age 18 and 16.0% of those age 65 or over.

Media
 WWGY 99.3 "Today's Best Music with "Ace & TJ in the Morning"
 WRQR-FM 105.5 "Today's Best Music with "Ace & TJ in the Morning"
 WTPR-AM 710 "The Greatest Hits of All Time"

References

External links

Towns in Weakley County, Tennessee
Towns in Tennessee
1820s establishments in Tennessee
Populated places established in the 1820s